Lawrence Joseph O'Hara (30 April 1889 – 14 June 1919) was an Australian politician.

He was born at Taradale in New Zealand to labourer John O'Hara and Annie Dolan, both Irish-born. The family moved to Sydney when Lawrence was seven, and he was educated at Marist Brothers' College in Paddington. He worked as a clerk with the Immigration and Tourist Bureau from 1908 to 1916 and for the District Courts from 1916 to 1919. He was also a member of the Clerks' Union, the Australian Labor Party (serving on the central executive from 1917 to 1919) and a Paddington alderman (1917–19). 

In 1919 he was elected to the New South Wales Legislative Assembly in a by-election for the seat of Paddington, but he died twenty-two days later as a result of the influenza pandemic.  He is buried in the Waverley Cemetery.

References

1889 births

1919 deaths
Members of the New South Wales Legislative Assembly
Australian Labor Party members of the Parliament of New South Wales
20th-century Australian politicians
People from Taradale, New Zealand
New Zealand emigrants to Australia
Deaths from the Spanish flu pandemic in Australia
Deaths from pneumonia in Australia